This list comprises all players who have participated in at least one league match for Long Island Rough Riders in the USL since the league began keeping detailed records in 2003. Players who were on the roster but never played a first team game are not listed; players who appeared for the team in other competitions (US Open Cup, etc.) but never actually made an USL appearance are noted at the bottom of the page where appropriate.

A "*" indicates a player known to have appeared for the team prior to 2003.

A
  Gary Ablett *
  Mike Adamcewicz
  Joshua Allen
  Chris Aloisi
  Kevin Anderson *
  Peter Antoniades
  Ben Arikian
  Shane Arikian
  Chris Armas *
  Alex Ayala

B
  Anthony Barberio
  Stephan Barea
  Edgar Bartolomeu*
  Jose Batista
  Nelson Becerra
  Michael Behonick
  Rhett Bernstein
  Federico Bianchi
  Ricardo Blanchard
  Thomas Booth
  Rich Bradley
  Bobby Brennan †
  Mark Briggs
  Edson Buddle*

C
  Wilmer Cabrera
  Steve Cadet *
  Paul Caffrey
  Bouba Camara
  José Campos
  Pavelid Castañeda
  Mazen Chami
  Matt Chulis
  Jordan Cila
  Justin Corke
  Frank Costigliola
  Chris Cox
  Bryant Craft
  Sam Craven
  Josue Cruz

D
  Chris Da Silva *
  Stephen Danbusky
  Matthew DeMartini
  Ben Diallo
  Óscar Díaz *
  Ruben Diaz
  John Diffley *
  Steve Dutreuil *

E
  Darrell Etienne
  Derrick Etienne

F
  Fernando Fernandes
  Menoscar Fernandez
  Flavio Ferri *
  Patrick Figueiredo
  Gary Flood
  Stephen Franzke
  Nate Friends *
  Rob Fucci

G
  Adrian Gaitan
  Kevin Garcia
  Jonathan Garcia-Torres
  Billy Gatti
  Paul Grafer
  Daniel Gray
  Mike Grella
  Alex Grendi
  Corey Gudmundson
  Joel Gustafsson

H
  Ray Hassett
  Andrew Herman
  Ben Hickey
  Shaun Higgins
  Adam Himeno
  Thorne Holder
  Bill Hole
  James Hunt

I
  Ernest Inneh *
  Alexandre Ivo

J
  Kyle Jack
  Steve Jolley
  Ricardo Joseph *

K
  Moussa Keita
  Irasto Knights
  Darko Kolić*
  Alexander Kouznetsov
  Danny Kramer
  Mickey Kydes*

L
  Richard Lanchard *
  Jason Landers
  Carlos Ledesma *
  Sal Leanti*
  Daniel Leon
  Tom Lips
  Martin Lynch
  Joe Lyons
  Gerry Lucey

M
  Luke Magill
  Joe Mallia
  Laurent Manuel
  Vinny Marcotrigano
  Diego Martínez
  Miguel Martínez
  Richard Martinez
  Saúl Martínez*
  Eric Masters
  Mike Masters
  Ricardo Maxwell-Ordain
  Anthony McCreath
 Mick McDermott
  Jim McElderry *
  Neil McNab*
  Declan McSheffrey*
  Ryan Meara
  Chris Megaloudis
  Óscar Mejía*
  Tim Melia
  Michael Mellis
  Tony Meola*
  Carlos Mendes*
  Chico Mieles*
  Garth Miller*
  Ishmael Mintah
  Andrew Mittendorf
  Dahir Mohammed
  Danny Mueller
  Martin Munnelly*
  Carlyle Myrie

N
  Evin Nadaner
  Alex Naples
  Douglas Narvaez-Cruz
  Jimmy Nealis
  Jamal Neptune
  Semso Nikocevic
  Jonathan García-Torres
  Richard Nuttal

O
  Conor O'Brien
  Mo Oduor*
  Mladen Opacic

P
  Mike Palacio
  John Pardini
  O'Neil Peart
  Laurence Piturro
  David Price*

R
  Joseph Ragusa
  Rodney Rambo*
  David Reed
  Paul Riley
  Travis Rinker*
  Paul Robson
  Graeme Roderick
  Paul Roderick
  Jim Rooney*

S
  John Sanfilippo
  Dominick Sarle
  Giovanni Savarese*
  Mark Secko
  Tal Sheinfeld
  Dan Sirota
  Oliver Skelding
  Adam Smith
  Lee Snodin
  Jack Stefanowski
  Brandon Sullivan
  Gary Sullivan
  Jose Sura-Reyes
  Moussa Sy

T
  Tadeu Terra
  Alex Tobon-Villa
  Michael Todd
  Vincent Treglia

V
  Fabian Vega *
  Guillermo Valencia
  Jesse Van Saun*
  Danny Vitiello

W
  Jimmy Walther
  Drew Watcher
  Matthew Watts
  Cordt Weinstein*
  Adam Weinzimer
  Ronan Wiseman
  John Wolyniec *
  Hector Wright *

Y
  Rob Youhill

Z
  Jeff Zaun*
  Kerry Zavagnin *

Sources

2010 Long Island Rough Riders stats
2009 Long Island Rough Riders stats
2008 Long Island Rough Riders stats
2007 Long Island Rough Riders stats
2006 Long Island Rough Riders stats
2005 Long Island Rough Riders stats

References

Long Island Rough Riders
 
Association football player non-biographical articles